The British Virgin Islands Olympic Committee (IOC code: IVB) is the National Olympic Committee representing the British Virgin Islands. It is also the body responsible for the British Virgin Islands's representation at the Commonwealth Games.

See also
British Virgin Islands at the Olympics
British Virgin Islands at the Commonwealth Games

References

External links
 Official website

British Virgin Islands
British Virgin Islands
British Virgin Islands at the Olympics
Olympic
1980 establishments in the British Virgin Islands
Sports organizations established in 1980